Linospadix monostachyos known as the walking stick palm is a small palm growing in rainforest understorey in Queensland and New South Wales.

References

External links 

 Linospadix monostachyos  (Mart.) H.Wendl. from PlantNET

 Linospadix monostachya Palm and Cycads Societies of Australia webpage. Accessed 27 June 2009 

monostachyos
Garden plants
Palms of Australia
Flora of New South Wales
Flora of Queensland
Plants described in 1838